Hemilienardia minor is a species of sea snail, a marine gastropod mollusk in the family Raphitomidae.

Description
The length of the shell attains 4½ mm, its diameter 1¾ mm.

(Original description) it can only be distinguished from Hemilienardia apiculata (Montrouzier in Souverbie & Montrouzier, 1864) which has not yet been found at the Andamans, by its smaller size  The row of opaque, white spots on the back of the body whorl are very characteristic. It is nearest allied to Hemilienardia malleti (Récluz, 1852) which also lives at the Andamans and under precisely similar conditions.

Distribution
This marine species occurs off the Andaman Islands

References

 Wiedrick S.G. (2017). Aberrant geomorphological affinities in four conoidean gastropod genera, Clathurella Carpenter, 1857 (Clathurellidae), Lienardia Jousseaume, 1884 (Clathurellidae), Etrema Hedley, 1918 (Clathurellidae) and Hemilienardia Boettger, 1895 (Raphitomidae), with the descriptionof fourteen new Hemilienardia species from the Indo-Pacific. The Festivus. special issue: 2-45.

External links
 

minor
Gastropods described in 1875